A Lilian date is the number of days since the beginning of the Gregorian calendar on October 15, 1582, regarded as Lilian date 1.  It was invented by Bruce G. Ohms of IBM in 1986 and is named for Aloysius Lilius, who devised the Gregorian Calendar. Lilian dates can be used to calculate the number of days between any two dates occurring since the beginning of the Gregorian calendar. It is currently used by date conversion routines that are part of IBM Language Environment (LE) software and in IBM AIX COBOL.

The Lilian date is only a date format: it is not tied to any particular time standard. Another, better known, date notation that is used for similar purposes is the Julian date, which is tied to Universal time (or some other closely related time scale, such as International Atomic Time). The Julian date always begins at noon, Universal Time, and a decimal fraction may be used to represent the time of day. In contrast, Ohms did not make any mention of time zones or time of day in his paper.
 
If the Lilian date was to be reckoned in Universal Time, and if the Lilian date is taken to begin at midnight, the Lilian date can be obtained from the Julian date by subtracting  from the Julian date, and ignoring the decimal fraction in the result.

References

See also
 Rata Die

Calendaring standards
Computer data
IBM software